Ol' Brown Ears Is Back is an album released by The Jim Henson Company through BMG Kidz in 1993. The album consists of 14 songs recorded by American puppeteer Jim Henson as the Muppet character Rowlf the Dog. Although released three years after Henson's death, the tracks were recorded in 1984. It was released in CD and cassette form, with the latter including a poster.

The album's title is a reference to Frank Sinatra's 1973 album Ol' Blue Eyes Is Back.

Songs
Ol' Brown Ears Is Back features Jim Henson performing songs as Muppet Rowlf the Dog. The tracks include "Lydia the Tattooed Lady", a song composed by Harold Arlen and Yip Harburg that first appeared in the 1939 film At the Circus, in which it was performed by Groucho Marx; "Eight Little Notes", a song that includes a rendition of "Für Elise" by Ludwig van Beethoven; "Halfway Down the Stairs" and "Cottleston Pie" by author A. A. Milne, the latter originally appearing as a poem in Milne's Winnie-the-Pooh stories; "Bein' Green", originally performed by Henson as Kermit the Frog on The Muppet Show; and "New York State of Mind" by Billy Joel.

Reception
Lynne Heffley of the Los Angeles Times reviewed the album positively, calling it "a treasure for Henson fans and a family listening treat."

Track listing

Personnel

 Rowlf the Dog – primary artist
 Jim Henson – piano, producer, vocals
 Derek Scott – piano
 Chris Boardman – arranger, associate producer, conductor
 Robert Kraft – producer
 Sandy De Crescent – orchestra contractor
 Nancy Fogarty – editing, music editor
 Larry Grossman – creative consultant
 Dave Collins – mastering

 Dave Hunt – engineer
 Dennis Sands – engineer, mixing
 Tom Hardisty – assistant engineer
 Brandon Harris – assistant engineer
 Charles Paakkari – assistant engineer
 Jonathan Rutley – assistant engineer
 Theo Panagopoulos – art direction
 Corey Edmonds Millen – design
 John Barrett – photography

References

1993 albums
The Muppets albums